To be macho is to possess machismo or exaggerated masculinity.

Macho may also refer to:

Arts and Entertainment
Macho (band), a short-lived Italian-American disco/R&B group in the late 1970s
Macho (album), a 1975 album by Hungarian guitarist Gábor Szabó
El Macho, a song on the Sailing to Philadelphia album by Mark Knopfler
Macho, the original title of the 1975 novel, Cry Macho
El Macho, a 1977 Italian-Argentine Spaghetti Western film
the title character of the 1970 Civil War film Macho Callahan, played by David Janssen
Macho (film), a 2016 Mexican film

People
 Macho (surname), a list of people
 Macho (nickname), a list of people nicknamed "Macho" or "El Macho"

Science and technology
Massive compact halo object (MACHO), a hypothesised astronomical body to explain the dark matter in galaxy halos
 MACHO Project, an observational search for MACHOs
Mach-O, binary file format on Mach-kernel systems
 Marine Cable Hosted Observatory (MACHO), an underwater seismic monitoring network

Other uses
Toyota Land Cruiser (J40) (Toyota Macho in Venezuela), a four-wheel-drive vehicle
Bursera glabrifolia, a Mexican tree called macho in woodcarving
"El macho", a pair of percussive claves' striking clave
, a river in Vázquez de Coronado, Costa Rica

See also

Machos, a community in Greece
Machos (TV series), a Chilean telenovela
Mach O (disambiguation)
Macho man (disambiguation)